Qaleh-ye Seyyed or Qaleh-i-Saiyid may refer to various places in Iran:
 Qaleh-ye Seyyed, Kazerun, Fars Province
 Qaleh-ye Seyyed, alternate name of Borj-e Seyyed, Kazerun County, Fars Province
 Qaleh-ye Seyyed, Mohr, Fars Province
 Qaleh-ye Seyyed, Behbahan, Khuzestan Province
 Qaleh-ye Seyyed, Dezful, Khuzestan Province
 Qaleh-ye Seyyed, Ramhormoz, Khuzestan Province
 Qaleh-ye Seyyed, Tehran